In geometry and topology, given a group G, an equivariant bundle is a fiber bundle such that the total space and the base spaces are both G-spaces and the projection map  between them is equivariant:  with some extra requirement depending on a typical fiber.

For example, an equivariant vector bundle is an equivariant bundle.

References 
Berline, Nicole; Getzler, E.; Vergne, Michèle (2004), Heat Kernels and Dirac Operators, Berlin, New York: Springer-Verlag

Fiber bundles